Taus is an unincorporated community located in the town of Franklin, Manitowoc County, Wisconsin, United States.

The community was named for Domažlice, Czech Republic, which is known as Taus in German.

Images

References

Unincorporated communities in Manitowoc County, Wisconsin
Unincorporated communities in Wisconsin